St Dunstan's Cathedral is an Anglican church on  Benoni, Gauteng, South Africa. The current dean is Simon Aiken.

References 

Anglican cathedrals in South Africa